My Big Friggin' Wedding is a reality show airing on VH1. It follows 5 New Jersey couples as they prepare for their wedding.

Couples
 Sandra Venturi and Joey Cimino
 Tammie and Danny
 Alyssa and Tyler
 Matt Rawlins and Amanda Perello
 Megin Klunck and Johnny "Meatballs" DeCarlo

References

2010 American television series debuts
Television shows set in New Jersey
Television shows filmed in New Jersey
English-language television shows
VH1 original programming
2010s American reality television series